Rhodora Javier Cadiao is a Filipina politician. She was born to Josue Lacson Cadiao, a former Governor of Antique, and Lolita Solis Javier, a former Vice Governor. Her maternal grandmother Esperanza Solis-Javier (former mayor of Culasi, Antique) was the first female mayor in the province. She is currently the Governor of Antique province in the Western Visayas Region. As a re-election-seeking candidate in the May 13, 2019 election under the National Unity Party, she defeated Exequiel Javier from the Liberal Party. She was re-elected for a third term in 2022.

References

External links
Province of Antique

|-

|-

Karay-a people
Living people
21st-century Filipino women politicians
21st-century Filipino politicians
Governors of Antique (province)
National Unity Party (Philippines) politicians
Women provincial governors of the Philippines
Year of birth missing (living people)
Members of the Philippine Independent Church